Giuliano Di Baldassarre is a Professor of Hydrology at Uppsala University and the Director of the Centre of Natural Hazards and Disaster Science, Sweden. He was awarded the American Geophysical Union Whiterspoon Lecture in 2020 and the European Geosciences Union Plinius Medal in 2021.

Early life and education 
Di Baldassarre studied environmental engineering with a focus on water resources at University of Bologna where he graduated summa cum laude in 2002. After his PhD in Hydrology in 2006, he continued his scientific career by doing a postdoc at the University of Bristol.

Research and career 
Di Baldassarre joined the UNESCO-IHE Institute for Water Education in Delft as a Senior Lecturer in 2009. He was awarded the EGU Outstanding Early Career Scientist Award (2012) and the AGU Early Career Hydrologic Science Award (2012) for his work on flood risk. He was also the project coordinator of the European Commission FP7 funded project KULTURisk – A knowledge-based approach to develop a culture of risk prevention in Europe (2011-2014).

Di Baldassarre joined Uppsala University in 2014, where he today is a Professor of Hydrology. He leads the ERC Consolidator Grant project, HydroSocialExtremes, which addresses the interplay between hydrological extremes and society. He is also the Director of the Centre of Natural Hazards and Disaster Science, which focuses on natural hazards, social vulnerability and societal security. He was the appointed Chair of Panta Rhei: Change in Hydrology and Society during 2017–2019, a global decadal initiative of the International Association of Hydrological Sciences (IAHS). Di Baldassarre is also a dedicated educator. He has mentored 10 postdocs and supervised over 15 PhD students and more than 60 MSc students at UNESCO-IHE Institute for Water Education in Delft and Uppsala University.

Through his research, Di Baldassarre has contributed to our understanding of the complex feedbacks between hydrological extremes and society, where, among many things, his development of socio-hydrological models on the dynamic two-way feedbacks between hydrological extremes (droughts and floods) and society have provided key process insights into the concepts of adaptation, levee effects and legacy. In 2020, he was ranked amongst top 2% of scientists in the world for career-long citation impact according to new citation ranking developed by Stanford University and published in the journal PLoS Biology

Awards and honors 
His awards and honors include:

 2012 - Outstanding Early Career Scientist Award by the European Geosciences Union (EGU)
 2012 - Early Career Hydrologic Science Award by the American Geophysical Union (AGU)
 2017 - Consolidator Grant by the European Research Council (ERC)
 2020 - Theréus Prize by the Royal Society of Sciences in Uppsala
 2020 - AGU’s Whiterspoon Lecture
 2021 - EGU’s Plinius Medal

Notable publications 
Di Baldassarre's most cited research has been on socio-hydrology, flood risk, natural hazards, and coupled human-nature systems. Here is a selection of some of his most highly cited works:

 Di Baldassarre G, A Montanari (2009), Uncertainty in river discharge observations: a quantitative analysis, Hydrology and Earth System Sciences, 13 (6), 913–921. https://doi.org/10.5194/hess-13-913-2009
 Di Baldassarre G, A Viglione, G Carr, L Kuil, JL Salinas, G Blöschl (2013), Socio-hydrology: conceptualising human-flood interactions, Hydrology and Earth System Sciences, 17 (8), 3295–3303. https://doi.org/10.5194/hess-17-3295-2013
 Di Baldassarre, G., Sivapalan, M., Rusca, M., et al. (2019). Sociohydrology: Scientific challenges in addressing the sustainable development goals. Water Resources Research, 55, 6327–6355. https://doi.org/10.1029/2018WR023901
 Di Baldassarre, G., Nohrstedt, D., Mård, J., et al. (2018). An Integrative Research Framework to Unravel the Interplay of Natural Hazards and Vulnerabilities, Earth's Future, 6, 305–310. https://doi.org/10.1002/2017EF000764
 Mård, J., Di Baldassarre, G., Mazzoleni, M. (2018) Nighttime light data reveal how flood protection shapes human proximity to rivers. Science Advances, 4(8), eaar5779. https://doi.org/10.1126/sciadv.aar5779 
 Di Baldassarre, G., Wanders, N., AghaKouchak, A., Kuil, L., Rangecroft, S., Veldkamp, T.I.E., Garcia, M., van Oel, P.R., Breinl, K., and Van Loon A.F. (2018). Water shortages worsened by reservoir effects. Nature Sustainability, 1, 617–622. https://doi.org/10.1038/s41893-018-0159-0
 Di Baldassarre, G., Mazzoleni, M. & Rusca, M. (2021). The legacy of large dams in the United States. Ambio. https://doi.org/10.1007/s13280-021-01533-x.

References 

Italian academics
Year of birth missing (living people)
Living people
Academic staff of Uppsala University
Hydrologists